The singles discography of British-Australian recording artist Olivia Newton-John consists of 69 singles, three as a featured artist and 25 promotional recordings. She was a four-time Grammy award winner who amassed five number-one and ten other Top Ten Billboard Hot 100 singles, seven Top Ten Billboard Hot Country singles, and two number-one Billboard 200 solo albums. Ten of her singles topped Billboard'''s adult contemporary music singles chart. Eleven of her singles have been certified gold by the RIAA. She sold an estimated 100 million records worldwide, making her one of the world's best-selling artists of all time.

Newton-John's first chart success was the 1971 single, "If Not for You", which became a top ten recording in several countries including Australia. In 1973, "Let Me Be There" became her first single to reach commercial success in the United States. It reached number six on the Billboard Hot 100, number three on the adult contemporary chart and number seven on the country songs chart. The song established Newton-John as both a pop and country artist. Between 1974 and 1977, Newton-John regularly made the top ten on the American pop, adult contemporary and country charts. Her most successful were "If You Love Me (Let Me Know)", "Please Mr. Please", "I Honestly Love You" and "Have You Never Been Mellow". It was "I Honestly Love You" that became her most successful, topping music charts in Australia, Canada and the United States.

In 1978, Newton-John starred in the film Grease. Its success began a new era of music success for Newton-John, with "You're the One That I Want", "Summer Nights" and "Hopelessly Devoted to You" reaching the top ten of the music charts throughout the world. She transitioned further into pop music after starring in 1980's Xanadu with both "Magic" and the title track becoming number one singles internationally. However, it was 1981's "Physical" that became her most successful recording. It topped the charts in Australia, Belgium, Canada, New Zealand, United Kingdom and the United States. During the decade she continued having singles reach the top ten with songs like "Heart Attack" and "Twist of Fate".

In the 90s, Newton-John's singles began reaching progressively lower chart positions. This began after the success of the 1990 duet with John Travolta called "The Grease Megamix". The single topped the Australian pop chart and reached the top ten in several other countries. Further singles like "Deeper Than the River" and "No Matter What You Do" reached positions outside the top 40 in Australia in the middle of the decade. In 1998, she re-recorded "I Honestly Love You" and the new version made chart positions in Australia and the United States. On the American adult contemporary chart, the re-recording reached number 18. It was not until 2010 that Newton-John made several international charts with a re-recording of "Physical". The song was cut with the cast of Glee'', which Newton-John appeared on. She released several more singles before her death in 2022 including the number one American dance single, "You Have to Believe".

As lead artist

1960s–1970s

1980s

1990s

2000s

2010s–2020s

As featured artist

Promotional singles

Other appearances

See also
Olivia Newton-John albums discography
Olivia Newton-John videography

Notes

References

External links
 
 
 

Discography
Discographies of Australian artists
Discographies of British artists
Pop music discographies
Disco discographies